Anders Arvid Lidén (born 2 January 1949 in Oskarshamn, Sweden) was the Permanent Representative of Sweden to the United Nations from 2004 to 2010. He was President of the UNICEF Executive Board in 2008.

Education 
Lidén holds a PhD in political science from the Lund University.

Career 
In 1979, Lidén joined the Foreign Ministry in Stockholm, and has held numerous posts there, including that of Second Secretary from 1980 to 1983, First Secretary from 1983 to 1991, Counsellor from 1991 to 1992, and Deputy Assistant Under Secretary from 1992 to 1993, and Assistant Under Secretary from 1993 until 1996. He was Chargé d'Affaires at Sweden's Embassy in Jordan in 1999, and served as Sweden's Ambassador to Israel and Cyprus from 1999 to 2002. From 2002 until his appointment to the UN, he served as Director-General for Political Affairs in the Ministry of Foreign Affairs. In 2004, Lidén was named Permanent Representative of Sweden to the United Nations and held that position until 2010. Lidén became ambassador to Zimbabwe from 2010 to 2012 and was subsequently named as the new Swedish ambassador to Finland.

In 2007 Liden attended a meeting organized by the American Iranian Council which brought together numerous national and international policy makers in an attempt to improve their understanding of Iran's role in Iraq and its nuclear enrichment intentions/capabilities. Others in attendance at this meeting were Congressman Dennis Kucinich (D-OH), Ambassador Javad Zarif from Iran 's UN Mission, Senator Chuck Hagel, Mr. Nicholas Kristof from the New York Times, and a host of other distinguished academics, businessmen, nonprofit representatives and private citizens.

References

External links
https://www.un.org/webcast/ga/61/pdfs/sweden-e.pdf

1949 births
Living people
People from Oskarshamn Municipality
Permanent Representatives of Sweden to the United Nations
Ambassadors of Sweden to Israel
Ambassadors of Sweden to Cyprus
Ambassadors of Sweden to Finland
Ambassadors of Sweden to Zimbabwe
Swedish officials of the United Nations
Chairmen and Presidents of UNICEF